Synoria is a genus of snout moths. It was first described by Ragonot in 1888.

Species
 Synoria antiquella (Herrich-Schäffer, 1855)
 Synoria euglyphella Ragonot, 1888

References

Phycitini
Pyralidae genera